5 de Mayo is a Panama Metro station on Line 1. It was one of the metro network's first 11 stations, opened on 5 April 2014 and commencing operations the following day. 

The station is the closest to Panama City's Old Town. It is also located closest to the Metropolitan cathedral, Cinta Costera and Oceanographic museum. In its first year of operations, 5 de Mayo was the second most used station on the network, carrying 16% of the system's users at peak times.

References

Panama Metro stations
2014 establishments in Panama
Railway stations opened in 2014